Shum Kwok Pui (born 11 August 1970 in Hong Kong) is a Hong Kong former footballer who played as a central defender and is currently the assistant coach of Hong Kong Premier League club Happy Valley.

Coaching career

Pegasus
Shum joined Pegasus in the 2008 as an assistant. He left the club by mutual consent in June 2011.

South China
As part of a partnership with Chelsea Soccer School, Sham returned to South China as the coach of the U-18 squad.

Happy Valley
South China decided to end their partnership with Chelsea after the 2015-16 season. As a result, Chelsea found a new partner in Happy Valley with which to loan their students. Sham decided to follow Chelsea and was named the manager at Happy Valley in September 2016.

On 15 July 2019, Shum ceded his head coaching duties to Pau Ka Yiu while remaining with Happy Valley as an assistant.

Honours
Eastern
Hong Kong Senior Shield: 2007–08

Notes and references

External links
Shum Kwok Pui at HKFA

1970 births
Living people
Hong Kong footballers
Hong Kong international footballers
Hong Kong football managers
Association football midfielders
Association football defenders
South China AA players
Eastern Sports Club footballers
Hong Kong First Division League players
Association football utility players
Hong Kong League XI representative players
Footballers at the 1994 Asian Games
Footballers at the 1998 Asian Games
Asian Games competitors for Hong Kong